Karim Sène (born 26 August 1971 in Condat, Cantal, France) is a retired Senegalese athlete who specialized in the pole vault. He won multiple medals on the regional level throughout his career.

He has personal bests of 5.21 metres outdoors (2003) and 5.14 metres indoors (2007). Both are current Senegalese records.

Competition record

References

1971 births
Living people
Senegalese pole vaulters
Male pole vaulters
Senegalese male athletes
African Games silver medalists for Senegal
African Games medalists in athletics (track and field)
African Games bronze medalists for Senegal
Athletes (track and field) at the 2003 All-Africa Games
Athletes (track and field) at the 2007 All-Africa Games
20th-century Senegalese people
21st-century Senegalese people